Joe FM may refer to:
 TV 38.9 KZHO-LD and 87.9 KJIB-LP JoeFM.net, and TV and radio station in Houston, Texas
 Joe FM (Belgium), a nationwide commercial radio station in Belgium
 97.3 Joe FM or WMJO, a radio station licensed to Essexville, Michigan, United States
 CKNG-FM, a radio station licensed to  Edmonton, Alberta, Canada, previously known as Joe FM